The National University of Lomas de Zamora (UNLZ) is an Argentine state national university located in Lomas de Zamora, Buenos Aires Province. Maintaining extensive research facilities, and with over 30,000 students, UNLZ is one of the most important universities of the Greater Buenos Aires area.

The university includes five departments: Agronomy, Economics, Engineering, Law, and Social Sciences. The Media Department, part of the School of Social Sciences, publishes InfoRegión, an online periodical covering the Greater Buenos Aires area.

References

External links

Lomas de Zamora
Educational institutions established in 1972
Buildings and structures in Lomas de Zamora
Universities in Buenos Aires Province